Pongalo Pongal is a 1997 Tamil-language comedy film directed by V. Sekhar. The film stars Vignesh, Vadivelu, Charle, Chinni Jayanth, and Vivek. Sangita Madhavan Nair, Kovai Sarala, Indhu, and Latha play the female leads. Supporting roles are done by Malaysia Vasudevan, Thyagu, Rajesh, and Vennira Aadai Moorthy. The film had music by Deva, cinematography by G. Rajendran and editing by A. P. Manivannan. The film released on 9 May 1997 and became a commercial success at the box office.

Plot
Subramani, Vellaisamy, Arumugam, and Ponrasu are four friends from poor families; they are graduates but cannot find jobs. Their fathers feel that they are good-for-nothing and decide to corrupt the politician Anja Nenjam to find them a decent job. Anja Nenjam is linked to Pannaiyar, a ruthless landlord who exploited the villagers. Pannaiyar orders him to flee with their money, otherwise, nobody will respect him. Their friend Pazhanisamy, who is supposed to be a supervisor in the city, is back to his village and was also cheated by Anja Nenjam. The five friends, on advice of a retired school teacher, decide to become milk suppliers in their village.

Cast

Vignesh as Subramani
Vadivelu as Vellaisamy
Charle as Arumugam
Chinni Jayanth as Ponrasu
Vivek as Pazhanisamy
Sangita as Chitra
Kovai Sarala as Meena
Indhu as Rukku
Vizhuthugal Latha
Malaysia Vasudevan as Pannaiyar
Thyagu as Anja Nenjam
Rajesh as School Master
Vennira Aadai Moorthy as Meena's father
Vasu Vikram as Neighbouring village Pannaiyar's son
Shanmugasundaram as Pichandi, Subramani's father
Vadivukkarasi as Subramani's mother
Kumarimuthu as Vellaisamy's father
Shanmugasundari as Vellaisamy's mother
Oru Viral Krishna Rao as Ponrasu's father
Bonda Mani as Pannaiyar's servant
Chelladurai as Asha's father

Soundtrack

The film score and the soundtrack were composed by Deva. The soundtrack, released in 1997, features 5 tracks with lyrics written by Vaali.

References

1997 films
Films scored by Deva (composer)
1990s Tamil-language films
Films directed by V. Sekhar